Asthenosoma periculosum is a species of sea urchin of the family Echinothuriidae. Their armour is covered with spines. It is placed in the genus Asthenosoma and lives in the sea. Asthenosoma periculosum was first scientifically described in 1964 by Endean.

See also 
 Asthenosoma intermedium
 Asthenosoma marisrubis
 Asthenosoma varium

References 

periculosum
Animals described in 1964